In enzymology, a glycyrrhizinate beta-glucuronidase is an enzyme that catalyzes the chemical reaction

glycyrrhizinate + H2O  1,2-beta-D-glucuronosyl-D-glucuronate + glycyrrhetinate

Thus, the two substrates of this enzyme are glycyrrhizinate and H2O, whereas its two products are 1,2-beta-D-glucuronosyl-D-glucuronate and glycyrrhetinate.

This enzyme belongs to the family of hydrolases, to be specific those glycosidases that hydrolyse O- and S-glycosyl compounds.  The systematic name of this enzyme class is glycyrrhizinate glucuronosylhydrolase. Other names in common use include glycyrrhizin beta-hydrolase, glycyrrhizin hydrolase, and glycyrrhizinic acid hydrolase.

See also
Alpha-glucuronidase
Beta-glucuronidase
Glucuronosyl-disulfoglucosamine glucuronidase

References

 

EC 3.2.1
Enzymes of unknown structure